Kiril Yovovich (29 December 1905 – 9 February 1976) was a Bulgarian footballer who played as an inside forward for Levski Sofia and Bulgaria during the 1920s. He was born in Sofia.

Career 
Yovovich start to play football in FC Bulgaria, before moved to Levski Sofia in 1919. With the Bulgarian national team he participated at the 1924 Summer Olympics.

Career statistics

Honours

Player 
Levski Sofia
 Bulgarian State Football Championship
 Runner-up (1): 1925

 Sofia Championship
 Champion (3): 1923, 1924, 1925

 Ulpia Serdika Cup
 Winner (1): 1926

Manager 
Levski Sofia
 Bulgarian State Football Championship
 Champion (1): 1937

References

External links 

Profile at LevskiSofia.info
Kiril Yovovich's profile at Retro-Football.bg 

1905 births
1976 deaths
Bulgarian footballers
Bulgaria international footballers
Footballers at the 1924 Summer Olympics
PFC Levski Sofia players
Footballers from Sofia
Bulgarian football managers
PFC Levski Sofia managers
Association football forwards
Olympic footballers of Bulgaria